Libido is the fourth album by the American ska punk band Buck-O-Nine, released in 1999 on TVT Records.

Production
The album marked an attempt by the band to broaden its traditional ska punk sound.

Critical reception
The Hamilton Spectator wrote: "Mixing trumpets and trombones with hurry-up snare shots and scratchy guitar breaks, Buck-O-Nine prove that ska's hyperkinetic zeal still sounds pretty good when it's matched with a wry, knowing wink." The Calgary Herald thought that "if you live and die by the sound of suburban pseudo-angst with a tight horn section, this is manna from heaven ... If you're living in 1999—heck, even 1998—this already sounds nostalgic."

Track listing
"Who Are They?" – 3:02
"Tell It Like It Was" – 3:20
"Something Funny" – 3:41
"Falling Back to Sleep" – 3:01
"Swimming in the Sand" – 2:58
"Sunlight" – 3:06
"Awkward Girl" – 2:54
"Headlines" – 3:45
"A Lot in My Head" – 2:37
"Here We Go Again" – 3:14
"All Along" – 2:57
"On a Sunny Day" – 2:51
"Pigeonhole Disease" – 2:47

Credits

Performance
Jon Pebsworth – Vocals
Jonas Kleiner – Guitar
Dan Albert – Trombone
Anthony Curry – Trumpet
Craig Yarnold – Tenor Sax
Scott Kennerly – Bass
Chuck Treece – Drums

Production
Produced by Stiff Johnson and Buck-O-Nine
Recorded at Big Fish Studios, San Diego, CA and assisted by Paul Waroff
Additional production by Howard Bensen on tracks 1,2,3,5,7,12
Engineered by Stiff Johnson
Additional engineering by Steve Kravac on tracks 1,2,3,5,7,12
Tracks 1,2,3,5,7,12 mixed by Chris Lord-Alge
Tracks 4,6,8,9,10,11,13 mixed by Kevin Shirley
Mastered by Gavin at The Masteringlab
Cover & band photography by Sean Murphy
A&R - Leonard B. Johnson

References

1999 albums
Buck-O-Nine albums
TVT Records albums

pt:リヴィド (Libido)